Damián Iguacén Borau (12 February 1916 – 24 November 2020) was a Spanish bishop of the Roman Catholic Church.

Life
Iguacén Borau was born in Fuencalderas, Spain and ordained a priest on 7 June 1941. He was consecrated bishop of the Barbastro Diocese on 11 October 1970. Subsequently, he was transferred to the Diocese of Teruel and Albarracín on 23 September 1974 and then to the tenth bishop of the Roman Catholic Diocese of San Cristóbal de La Laguna on 14 August 1984 where he remained until his retirement on 12 June 1991. 

He turned 100 in February 2016. At the age of 104 years, he was the oldest living Catholic bishop until his death. Iguacén Borau died on 24 November 2020, in Huesca, Spain at the age of 104.

Publications 
 Una visita a la catacumba zaragozana, Impr. Folios 1954
 Preces Laurentinas, 1964
 La Basílica de S. Lorenze de Huesca, 1969
 La Diócesis de Barbastro, Imp.Tipo-Linea, Zaragoza 1971, Depósito Legal Z-442-71
 San Ramón del Monte, Obispo de Barbastro, Talleres Editoriales "El Noticiero", Zaragoza 1972, Depósito Legal Z-4-72
 El patrimonio cultural de la Iglesia en España, La Editorial Católica 1982, 
 La Iglesia y Su Patrimonio Cultural, Edice Madrid 1984, 
 La ruta "Virgen de Candelaria": tradición, mensaje, compromiso : exhortación pastoral, Obispado de Tenerife 1990
 Diccionario del patrimonio cultural de la iglesia, Encuentro Ediciones Madrid 1991, 
 El arte en la liturgia (Band 47 von Cuadernos Phase), Centre de Pastoral Litúrgica 1993, 
 Diálogos con Santa María, madre de Dios, Producciones Gráficas 1994, 
 El Venerable Francisco Ferrer y los Operarios Misionistas: un grano de trigo caído en tierra, D. Iguacén 1997, 
 Incondicionalidad (Band 105 von Vida y misión), Edibesa 2004,

See also
Diocese of Tenerife
Diocese of Teruel and Albarracín
Barbastro Diocese

References

External links
Personal file in Catholic Hierarchy
Ternerife site

1916 births
2020 deaths
Deaths from the COVID-19 pandemic in Spain
Men centenarians
Spanish centenarians
20th-century Roman Catholic bishops in Spain
Roman Catholic bishops of San Cristóbal de La Laguna